Prak Chanratana (born 16 October 1993) is a former Cambodian footballer who last played for the Kirivong Sok Sen Chey in the Cambodian League and the Cambodia national football team.

References

1993 births
Living people
Cambodian footballers
Cambodia international footballers
People from Kampot province
Association football forwards
Nagaworld FC players